Curtis Publishing Co. v. Butts, 388 U.S. 130 (1967), was a landmark decision of the US Supreme Court establishing the standard of First Amendment protection against defamation claims brought by private individuals.

Background
The case involved a libel lawsuit filed by the former Georgia Bulldogs football coach Wally Butts against The Saturday Evening Post. The lawsuit arose from an article in the magazine, which alleged that Butts and the Alabama head coach Bear Bryant had conspired to fix games. The Butts suit was consolidated with another case, Associated Press v. Walker, and both cases were decided in one opinion.

In finding for Butts but against Walker, the Supreme Court gave some indications of when a "public figure" could sue for libel.

Decision
In a plurality opinion, written by Justice John Marshall Harlan II, the Supreme Court held that news organizations were protected from liability when they print allegations about public officials. However, New York Times Co. v. Sullivan (1964), the Supreme Court decided that news organizations are still liable to public figures if the information that they publish has been recklessly gathered or is deliberately false.

The Court ultimately ruled in favor of Butts, and The Saturday Evening Post was ordered to pay $3.06 million to Butts in damages, which was later reduced on appeal to $460,000.

The settlement was seen as a contributing factor in the demise of The Saturday Evening Post and its parent corporation, the Curtis Publishing Company, two years later. Butts and Bryant had sued for $10 million each. Bryant settled for $300,000.

See also
List of United States Supreme Court cases, volume 388

References

External links
 
 

1967 in United States case law
Alabama Crimson Tide football
Georgia Bulldogs football
The Saturday Evening Post
United States defamation case law
United States Free Speech Clause case law
United States Supreme Court cases
United States Supreme Court cases of the Warren Court